Islam is the religion of about 3% of the people of Réunion. Most large towns have a mosque, allowing the Muslim community to practice their religion.

In Réunion, Zarabes is the name given to the Muslim community of Réunion. The Muslims migrated to Réunion in mid-nineteenth century. Zarabes are mostly South Asian and specifically from the modern state Gujarat in India.
More recently, many Muslim immigrants from Mayotte (French overseas departement), the Comoros and African countries has arrived in Réunion.

See also
 Zarabes

References

External links

 Institut de Théologie Musulmane de la Réunion
 Centre Islamique de La Reunion
 Emission "Vivrel'islam" : L'islam de la Réunion - Fr2 26/10/14